Jubb al-Ghar ( jubb al-ghār) is a Syrian village located in Shathah Subdistrict in Al-Suqaylabiyah District, Hama. According to the Syria Central Bureau of Statistics (CBS), the village had a population of 821 in the 2004 census.

References 

Populated places in al-Suqaylabiyah District